Lubensky Uyezd (Лубенский уезд) was one of the subdivisions of the Poltava Governorate of the Russian Empire. It was situated in the central part of the governorate. Its administrative centre was Lubny.

Demographics
At the time of the Russian Empire Census of 1897, Lubensky Uyezd had a population of 136,613. Of these, 95.0% spoke Ukrainian, 3.3% Yiddish, 1.4% Russian, 0.1% Polish, 0.1% Belarusian and 0.1% German as their native language.

References

 
Uezds of Poltava Governorate
Poltava Governorate